Concepción Airport  is an airport serving Concepción, a town in the Santa Cruz Department of Bolivia. The runway is in the southern section of the town, which is in Bolivia's Gran Chaco region.

See also

Transport in Bolivia
List of airports in Bolivia

References

External links 
OpenStreetMap - Concepción
OurAirports - Concepción
SkyVector - Concepción
Fallingrain - Concepción Airport

Airports in Santa Cruz Department (Bolivia)